The Baumann Brigadier was a prototype American light transport aircraft of the late 1940s. It was a twin-engined monoplane, which, unusually, was of pusher configuration. Only two were built, plans for production never coming to fruition.

Development and design
Jack Baumann, who had worked for the Taylor Aircraft Company (later to become Piper Aircraft) and Lockheed, set up the Baumann Aircraft Corporation in Pacoima, Los Angeles, California in 1945.  His first design for the new company was the B-250 Brigadier, a twin-engined pusher monoplane intended as an executive transport. It was of all-metal construction, with cantilever shoulder mounted wings, and with the pusher engines mounted in nacelles on the wing. An enclosed cabin accommodated a pilot and four passengers, while the aircraft was fitted with a retractable nosewheel undercarriage.

The first prototype, powered by two  engines (hence the B-250 designation) flew on 20 June 1947. Piper Aircraft was interested in building a tractor version of the Brigadier, and purchased the B-250 prototype and its drawings, designating it the PA-21, with some sources  claiming that the B-250 formed the basis of the Piper Apache, although other sources state that Piper abandoned work on the PA-21 and that the Apache was unrelated.

Baumann continued development of the pusher Brigadier, with the second example, the B-290, being fitted with  Continental C-145 engines but was otherwise similar to the B-250. The B-290, registered N90616, crash-landed at Pacoima on January 8, 1953, heavily damaging the fuselage and injuring pilot Ward C. Vettel and flight engineer Thomas Cox. Production at a rate of one aircraft per month was planned for the B-290. The Brigadier was chosen by Willard Ray Custer as the basis of his Custer CCW-5, which used the fuselage and tail of the Brigadier, but had a modified wing with the engines sitting in U-shaped ducts, but other than the two CCW-5s no production of the B-290 followed. Baumann continued to propose more powerful versions of the Brigadier, but no airframes resulted.

Variants
B-250 Brigadier 
Initial prototype. Two  engines.
B-290 Brigadier
More powerful second prototype (two  engines).
B-360 Brigadier
Planned version with  Lycoming engines.
B-480 Super Brigadier
Planned enlarged version with  Continental O-470 engines.
Piper PA-21
Tractor-engined version, abandoned.

Specifications (B-290)

See also

Notes

References

Bridgman, Leonard. Jane's All The World's Aircraft 1953–54. London:Sampson Low, Marston & Company, 1953.
Mondey, David. The Illustrated Encyclopedia of Aircraft. London:Hamlyn Publishing, 1978. .

Further reading

External links

"Baumann B290 Brigadier". edcoatescollection
  "One Engine Keeps It Flying" , April 1949, Popular Science see bottom of page

Baumann aircraft
1940s United States civil utility aircraft
High-wing aircraft
Twin-engined pusher aircraft
Piper Aircraft, Inc.
Aircraft first flown in 1947